Đurđević (also transliterated Djurdjevic) is a Serbian surname derived from the masculine given names Đurađ or Đurđe, which are cognates of the name George.

It may refer to the following:

People 
Alexander Đurđević, a Serbian barrister working in NSW. 
Darko Đurđević, a Serbian footballer
Dejan Đurđević (born 1967), football manager and former player
Fahrudin Đurđević, a Macedonian footballer
Ignjat Đurđević (1675–1737), poet and translator
Ivan Đurđević (born 1977), footballer
Marko Djurdjević, a German illustrator and concept artist of Serbian descent
Milan Đurđević (born 1967), footballer
Miodrag Đurđević (born 1961), football player
Nenad Đurđević (born 1987), footballer
Nina Đurđević (born 1991), beauty pageant winner
Olivera Đurđević, a Serbian pianist, cembalist and professor
Uroš Đurđević (born 1994), footballer

Places 
Đurđević coal mine

See also 
Đorđević, a surname
Đurđevića Tara Bridge

Serbian surnames
Patronymic surnames
Surnames from given names